Year 935 (CMXXXV) was a common year starting on Thursday (link will display the full calendar) of the Julian calendar.

Events 
 By place 

 Europe 
 Spring – Arnulf I ("the Bad") of Bavaria invades Italy, crossing through the Upper Adige (modern Tyrol). He proceeds towards Verona to join his supporters. King Hugh of Provence takes a Burgundian army against him, and defeats Arnulf at Gossolengo, forcing him to return to Bavaria.
 Summer – Caliph Al-Qa'im bi-Amr Allah dispatches a Fatimid naval expedition under Ya'qub ibn Ishaq al-Tamimi to raid the coast of Provence and Liguria, sacking Genoa on 16 August and attacking Pisa. Ya'qub also raids Corsica and Sardinia before returning to Mahdia with some 8,000 prisoners.
 September 28 – Duke Wenceslaus I of Bohemia (the subject of the 1853 Christmas carol "Good King Wenceslas")  is murdered by a group of nobles led by his brother Boleslaus I ("the Cruel"), who succeeds him.
 Córdoba, capital of Al-Andalus, becomes the largest city of the world, taking the lead from Baghdad, capital of the Abbasid Caliphate.

 Africa 
 Summer – Muhammad ibn Tughj al-Ikhshid is appointed governor and becomes the ruler of Egypt and parts of Syria (or the Levant). He launches a campaign against his rival Ahmad ibn Kayghalagh by land and sea: the naval forces take Tinnis, and ibn Kayghalagh is forced to retreat. Ibn Tughj enters Fustat, making it his capital, and founds the Ikhshidid Dynasty.
 Ziri ibn Manad is installed as governor of central Maghreb. He initiates the construction of the fortress of Ashir, near Médéa (modern Algeria). It symbolises the rise of the Zirid Dynasty in the Western Mediterranean region.

 Arabian Empire 
 Emir Mardavij ibn Ziyar is murdered by Turkish slaves. He is succeeded by his brother and general Vushmgir, who is crowned as the new Ziyarid ruler in Rey (modern Iran).

 Asia 
 King Gyeongsun, the last ruler of the Kingdom of Silla, formally surrenders and abdicates in favour of Taejo of Goryeo. This completes Taejo's unification of Korea, bringing the Silla Dynasty to an end.
 Ki no Tsurayuki returns to Kyoto from Tosa Province, a journey that becomes the basis of the earliest surviving Japanese poetic diary, called the Tosa Nikki (Tosa Diary).
 King Gyeon Hwon of Hubaekje is overthrown by his eldest son Gyeon Singeom and put in prison, but he is able to escape.

 By topic 

 Religion 
 Winter – Pope John XI, the son of de facto Roman ruler Marozia, dies at Rome after a four-year reign.

Births 
 Abd al-Jabbar ibn Ahmad, Mu'tazilite theologian (d. 1025)
 Eochaid ua Flannacáin, Irish cleric and poet (d. 1004)
 Elvira Ramírez, princess and regent of León (approximate date)
 Folcuin, Frankish abbot of Saint Bertin (approximate date)
 Gao Qiong, Chinese general and governor (jiedushi) (d. 1006)
 Gerard of Toul, German priest and bishop (d. 994)
 Hrosvitha, German canoness and poet (approximate date)
 Michitsuna no Haha, Japanese female poet (d. 995)
 Ukhtanes of Sebastia, Armenian historian (d. 1000)
 Wulfrun, English noblewoman (approximate date)

Deaths 
 January 22 – Ma, empress of Southern Han
 September 28 – Wenceslaus I, duke of Bohemia
 October 24 – Li Yu, Chinese official and chancellor 
 November 17
 Chen Jinfeng, empress of Min (b. 893)
 Wang Yanjun, emperor of Min (Ten Kingdoms)
 Dai Siyuan, general of Later Liang (Five Dynasties)
 Govinda IV, ruler of the Rashtrakuta Dynasty (India)
 Gruffydd ab Owain, king of Glywysing (approximate date)
 John XI, pope of the Catholic Church (approximate date)
 Li Yichao, Chinese warlord and governor (jiedushi)
 Mardavij ibn Ziyar, founder of the Ziyarid Dynasty (Iran)
 Niftawayh, Abbasid scholar and grammarian (b. 858)
 Shahid Balkhi, Persian philosopher and poet 
 Trpimir II, king of Croatia (approximate date)
 Werner V, Frankish nobleman (approximate date)
 Yang Dongqian, Chinese official and chancellor
 Zhao Feng, Chinese official and chancellor

References